An event tree is an inductive analytical diagram in which an event is analyzed using Boolean logic to examine a chronological series of subsequent events or consequences. For example, event tree analysis is a major component of nuclear reactor safety engineering.

An event tree displays sequence progression, sequence end states and sequence-specific dependencies across time.

Analytical tool
Event tree analysis is a logical evaluative process which works by tracing forward in time or forwards through a causal chain to model risk.  It does not require the premise of a known hazard. An event tree is an inductive investigatory process.

In contrast, the Fault tree analysis (FTA) evaluates risk by tracing backwards in time or backwards through a cause chain.  The analysis takes as a premise a given hazard.  FTA is a deductive investigatory process.

Applications
An event tree may start from a specific initiator such as loss of critical supply, or component failure.

Some industries use both fault trees and event trees.  Software has been created for fault tree analysis and event tree analysis and is licensed for use at the world's nuclear power plants for Probabilistic Safety Assessment.

See also
 Event structure
 Root cause analysis
 Ishikawa diagram
 Why-Because analysis
 Failure mode and effects analysis (FMEA)

Notes

References
 National Research Council (US), Committee on Environmental Impacts Associated with Commercialization of Transgenic Plants, Board on Agriculture and Natural Resources, Division on Earth and Life Studies. (2002). Environmental Effects of Transgenic Plants: the Scope and Adequacy of Regulation. Washington, D.C.: National Academy Press. ;  OCLC 231950695
 Wang, John X. and Marvin L. Roush. (2000). What Every Engineer Should Know About Risk Engineering and Management. London: CRC Press. ;  OCLC 5030452

Quality
Reliability engineering
Risk analysis methodologies
Safety engineering